Southampton Operatic Society began life in 1924 as the Guild of the Above Bar Congregational Church and is the oldest musical society in the city.

Miss Edith Ashdown, the daughter of a Southampton businessman and a member of the Above Bar Congregational Church, gathered her friends (including Evelyn Thorne who ran a local ladies’ choir) to perform a musical play Princess Juju. This was well received so they decided to form a society and present Merrie England by Edward German at the Watts Hall.

For the next five years, the society alternated between dramatic and musical productions under the title of Southampton Above Bar Musical and Dramatic Society but in 1930 it separated into two distinct bodies - operatic and dramatic.  The latter group, The Southampton Amateur Dramatic Society (SADS) no longer exists.

The Second World War curtailed the activities of the society between 1939 and 1945 but it soon reformed to perform “Merrie England” once more in 1946. 

The works of Gilbert & Sullivan soon became the society’s annual offering  and it was not until 1980 that it began to perform two shows a year – even then it did not perform the full set of G&S operettas until its production of The Grand Duke in 2006. Since 1978 it has added musicals and classical operas to its repertoire.

Several past members have moved onto the professional stage including Barry Clark, Valerie Nunns, Anne Osborne. and Claire Rutter (who is Vice President of the Society).

In 1987 a junior section was formed in an effort to introduce younger members to its ranks and this has been a successful development. Now called Debut Youth Theatre it too has been the launch pad for several professional careers, notably Rae Baker, Nyle Wolfe, Laura Carmichael and, Simon Pontin.

Since 1998 the Society has been a regular contestant at the International Gilbert and Sullivan Festival held annually at Buxton Opera House and has won several awards, most recently for the Best Concerted Item in for 'The Matter Trio' from Ruddigore in 2008.

References

Amateur theatre companies in England
Organisations based in Southampton
British opera companies
Arts organizations established in 1924
Musical groups established in 1924